Santo Tirso parish is a former civil parish in the municipality of Santo Tirso, Portugal. In 2013, the parish merged into the new parish Santo Tirso, Couto (Santa Cristina e São Miguel) e Burgães. It was the most populous parish in the city of Santo Tirso.  It is an international textile center.

References

External links
Associação Humanitária B.V. Tirsenses (Amarelos)

Former parishes of Santo Tirso